Bureaucracy is an organizational structure with the task of implementing the decisions and policies of its governing body.

Bureaucracy may also refer to:
 Bureaucracy, one of the five seasons of the Discordian calendar
 Bureaucracy (book), a 1945 political treatise by Ludwig von Mises
 Bureaucracy (video game), a 1987 Infocom game by Douglas Adams
 Bureaucracy: What Government Agencies Do and Why They Do It, a 1989 book by James Q. Wilson
 Celestial bureaucracy, the pantheon of Chinese mythology
 Red tape, excessive regulation or adherence to standardized procedure
 Street-level bureaucracy, individuals who implement laws and public policies

See also
 Bureaucrat
 Byzantine aristocracy and bureaucracy
 Civil service
 Public administration
 Red tape